Hisashi is a masculine Japanese given name. Its meaning differs depending on the kanji used to write it.

Kanji
Single kanji used to write the name Hisashi include:
: "long time"
: "eternal"
: "still"
: "standard"
: "complete"
: "long"
: "life" (also with the kyūjitai variant )
: "long day"

There are more than a hundred different ways to write the name using two or three characters.

People with the name
, Japanese zoologist
, Japanese manga artist 
, Japanese manga artist
, Japanese actor
, Japanese guitarist and songwriter
, Japanese writer and playwright
, Japanese historian
, Japanese footballer
, Japanese ice hockey player
, Japanese football manager
, Japanese electrical engineer and computer scientist
, Japanese geologist
, Japanese football player
, Japanese painter
, Japanese alpine skier
, Japanese gymnast
, Japanese shogi player
, Japanese video game developer
, Japanese shogi player
, Japanese baseball player
, known mononymously as Hisashi (musician)
, Japanese football player
, Japanese baseball pitcher
, Japanese sumo wrestler
, Japanese organic chemist
, Japanese sumo wrestler

Fictional characters 

 Hisashi Kinoshita (木下 久志), a character from Haikyu!! with the position of wing spiker from Karasuno High
Hisashi Mitsui (三井 寿), a character from Slam Dunk

See also 

 , Japanese composer

References

Japanese masculine given names